John Paul is an English-language male  double name combining John and Paul. Equivalents in other languages include Jean-Paul (French), Juan Pablo (Spanish), and Giampaolo (Italian). 

People known as "John Paul" (without surname) include:
 Pope John Paul I (1912–1978)
 Pope John Paul II (1920–2005)
 John Paul Puthusery (born 1950), Malayalam screenwriter usually simply known as "John Paul"

Other people with the given name(s) "John Paul" include:
 John Paul Getty (disambiguation)
 John Paul Jones (disambiguation)
 John Paul Stevens, US Supreme Court Justice
 John Paul Vann
 John Paul Young, Scottish born Australian singer
 lists many more

See also
 John Paul (disambiguation)
 Pope John Paul (disambiguation)

Compound given names
English-language masculine given names